(At midnight), WAB 90, is a song composed by Anton Bruckner in 1886 on a text of Robert Prutz. About twenty years earlier Bruckner had already composed a song on the same text.

History 
Because of performance difficulties (humming voices and many modulations), the choir was enhanced by a harp. 

The work, of which the original manuscript is stored in the Österreichische Nationalbibliothek, was issued in the same year by the Strassburger Sängerhaus, and thereafter (1911) by Viktor Keldorfer (Universal Edition), together with the other setting (Um Mitternacht, WAB 89) and the other "midnight-song" Mitternacht, WAB 80.

Music 

The song is using the text by Robert Prutz, which Bruckner had already used for Um Mitternacht, WAB 89.

The 93-bar long work in F minor is scored for  choir and tenor soloist. Strophe 1 is sung by the choir. Strophe 2 (bar 31) and strophe 3 are sung by the tenor soloist with accompaniment of humming voices. Strophe 4 (bar 58) is sung by the choir.

Discography 

Um Mitternacht, WAB 90, is less popular than the previous setting WAB 89. A selection among the few recordings:
 Guido Mancusi, Chorus Viennensis, Herbert Lippert (tenor), Musik, du himmlisches Gebilde! – CD: ORF CD 73, 1995
 Thomas Kerbl, Männerchorvereinigung, Weltliche Männerchöre – CD: LIVA054, 2012

References

Sources 

 Anton Bruckner – Sämtliche Werke, Band XXIII/2:  Weltliche Chorwerke (1843–1893), Musikwissenschaftlicher Verlag der Internationalen Bruckner-Gesellschaft, Angela Pachovsky and Anton Reinthaler (Editor), Vienna, 1989
 Cornelis van Zwol, Anton Bruckner 1824–1896 – Leven en werken, uitg. Thoth, Bussum, Netherlands, 2012. 
 Uwe Harten, Anton Bruckner. Ein Handbuch. , Salzburg, 1996. .

External links 
 Um Mitternacht f-Moll, WAB 90 – Critical discography by Hans Roelofs 
 .
 The recording by the Männerchorvereinigung Bruckner 12 can be heard on YouTube: Um Mitternacht, WAB 90

Weltliche Chorwerke by Anton Bruckner
1886 compositions
Compositions in F minor